Agassiziella kwangtungiale is a moth in the family Crambidae. It is found in China.

References

Acentropinae
Moths of Asia
Moths described in 1925